The South African national cricket team toured Sri Lanka in July 2014 to play two Test matches and three One Day International matches. The Test series was originally scheduled for July 2013 but was then postponed until 2015 before being brought forward to July 2014.

Squads

Tour matches

One-day: Sri Lanka Board President's XI v South Africans

ODI series

1st ODI

2nd ODI

3rd ODI

Test series

1st Test

2nd Test

References

External links
 Series page on Wisden India

2014 in South African cricket
2014 in Sri Lankan cricket
International cricket competitions in 2014
2014
Sri Lankan cricket seasons from 2000–01